Afrocelestis lochaea is a moth of the family Tineidae. It was described in 1911 by Edward Meyrick and is found on the Seychelles.

References

Scardiinae
Moths described in 1911